Sampathige Savaal is a 1974 Indian Kannada-language drama film directed by A. V. Seshagiri Rao and produced by A. N. Murthy, based on the play Saahukaara written by B. P. Dhuttharagi. The film stars Rajkumar, Vajramuni and Manjula. The screenplay, dialogues and lyrics for the soundtracks were written by Chi. Udaya Shankar.

The film was a musical blockbuster with all the tracks composed by G. K. Venkatesh considered evergreen hits. Rajkumar became popular as a playback singer with the track Yaare Koogadali from the film which became an instant hit among the audiences. He would then go on to sing regularly for his films.

The film was remade in Telugu in 1975 as Thota Ramudu starring Chalam, in Tamil in 1975 as Pudhu Vellam starring Sivakumar and in Malayalam in 1976 as Themmadi Velappan starring Prem Nazir - making it the second Kannada movie to be remade in three other South Indian languages after School Master.

Plot
The film opens to a woodcutter chopping down a tree. He works for Siddappa (Vajramuni), a village landlord. The tree breaks at the stem and falls on him, killing him instantly. His wife Parvathamma (M. V. Rajamma) approaches Siddappa with her two children (Vishwa and Veerabhadra) and requests him to pay for the funeral expenses. Siddappa is however unconcerned and drives them away, which would go on to influence Veerabhadra ("Bhadra") hugely as he grows up. Both the children grow up into hardworking men; but, Vishwa works for Siddappa and stays in his good books while Bhadra grows into an easy going man with scant respect for Siddappa.

Vishwa requests Siddappa for financial help as the day of his wedding approaches. Siddappa lends him 1,000. The latter marries Mahalakshmi. Bhadra, on the other hand, angers Siddappa, his daughter Durga (Manjula) and his accountant Puttappa (Balakrishna) at every opportunity he gets. He humiliates Siddappa in front of the village gathering at a festival, which does not sit well with the latter. On another occasion, he cuts a few strands of Durga's hair using a sickle. Siddappa reports the matter to Bhadra's mother and brother stating that Bhadra had molested his daughter Durga. Enraged, Vishwa drives Bhadra out of their house. Bhadra enters Siddappa's house and threatens to really molest Durga in his presence. He however exits leaving her unharmed.

He stays at the village temple nearby. One day, his mother falls sick and expresses her desire to see him. Mahalakshmi proceeds to the temple to bring him home and takes a circuitous route through the forest. Siddappa, who is passing by, sees her and attempts to molest her. Her screams alert Bhadra who gets into a fist fight with Siddappa, ending in beating him black and blue. As a new marriage proposal to Durga comes, she confesses to her father of her romantic feelings toward Bhadra. An enraged Siddappa slaps her on the face following which she runs to Bhadra at the temple and confesses her feelings to him, who initially reluctant, accepts. Hearing the news, Siddappa sends Vishwa to threaten him with a revolver, claiming it to be unloaded, but unbeknownst to Vishwa, having loaded it beforehand with a single bullet. Mahalakshmi reaches the spot as an argument ensues between the two brothers. As she attempts to save Bhadra from the bullet fired by an unsuspecting Vishwa, she gets hit on her left shoulder. Enraged, Bhadra pursues Siddappa and gets into another fist fight with him. As he is about to strike him with an ax, the police arrive on the scene and arrest Siddappa for culpable homicide. Siddappa, before leaving, hands his daughter over to Bhadra.

Cast 

 Rajkumar as Veerabhadra
 Manjula as Durga
 Vajramuni as Siddappa
 Balakrishna as Puttappa
 M. V. Rajamma as Parvathi
 C. K. Kalavathi as Mahalakshmi
 B. Jaya as Subbalakshmi, Umapathi's wife
 Jayamma
 Suryakumari
 Raja Shankar as Vishwa
 H. R. Shastry as priest at temple
 Joker Shyam as Umapathi, Puttappa's son
 M. S. Sathya as Kittappa
 B. Hanumanthachar
 Shani Mahadevappa
 Comedian Guggu as Chennajja
 Tiptur Siddaramaiah
 Narayan
 Ellappa
 Master Hemachandra
 Master Bharath
 Chandrashekar in a cameo appearance
 Harshavardhan Rao in a cameo appearance

Production 
After many attempts to adapt B. P. Dhuttharagi's play Saahukaara into a film had previously failed, producer Parvathamma Rajkumar became interested. She asked screenwriter and Rajkumar's frequent collaborator Chi. Udayashankar to watch the play that was staged in Kanakapura during the time and report his view to her. Happy with the plot, the two proceed to go ahead with the project and having Rajkumar play the leading man; Udayashankar wrote the screenplay.

Upon Rajkumar's insistence, Vajramuni was cast in the role of Siddappa, the landlord. Director A. V. Seshagiri Rao, who was initially adamant on having Jayanthi as the female lead, relented after Rajkumar suggested that Manjula would be a better choice. The entirety of filming took place in Gajanur, a village in Tamil Nadu, where Rajkumar was born. The makers were unhappy with certain sequences on the film during the post-production stage leading them to reshoot those sequences again there.

The song "Yaare Koogadali" was originally intended to be sung by P. B. Sreenivas. However, his unavailability led composer G. K. Venkatesh suggest that Rajkumar sing it. Rajkumar went on to become a full-fledged playback singer after this. It was picturised on Rajkumar who is seated on a buffalo through most of the song.

Soundtrack 
The background score on the film and music for the soundtrack was scored by G. K. Venkatesh with lyrics for the soundtrack written by Chi. Udaya Shankar and R. N. Jayagopal.

References

External links 
 
 A detailed study of works by playwright Dhuttaragi.

1974 films
1970s Kannada-language films
Indian drama films
Indian films based on plays
Films scored by G. K. Venkatesh
Films with screenplays by Chi. Udayashankar
Kannada films remade in other languages
Films directed by A. V. Seshagiri Rao